Notre charge apostolique (our Apostolic Mandate) was a papal encyclical promulgated by Pope Pius X on August 15, 1910.

Context 
The Pope took issue with the socialist leanings of the Catholic 'Le Sillon' movement of Marc Sangnier. 
He said that Sillonists wanted to completely level social differences and to create a "One World Church" by joining "unbelievers". The Pope emphasized that a Catholic view of social justice meant considering the needs of both the powerful and poor. The Sillonists, he said, did not accept that authority comes from God down to the authorized leaders and from there to the people.

External links
 The English text of the Notre charge apostolique encyclical archived at Wayback Machine

Papal encyclicals
History of Catholicism in France
Religion and politics
Documents of Pope Pius X
1910 documents
1910 in Christianity
August 1910 events